The Navy Musicians Association (NMA) is a non-profit veterans organization of past and present United States Navy musicians. The NMA was founded in 1995 and has become a 501 (c) (19) tax exempt veteran's organization under the U.S. Tax Code.

Mission 
The purpose of the Navy Musicians Association is "to bring together, through annual reunions, past and present members of Navy bands; to promote camaraderie; to emphasize the importance of music in the Navy; and to maintain liaison with active bands in the Navy and Marine Corps, in order to preserve the tradition of Navy music."

Membership Eligibility 
All past and present members of official United States Navy bands are eligible for membership. There are no time-in-service or rank requirements.

History
The NMA was founded in 1995 by a group of retired Navy musicians residing in the Hampton Roads area of Virginia who had served at the United States Armed Forces School of Music and in the United States Atlantic Fleet band. The organization has grown to accept former and present members of all official U.S. Navy bands.

Reunions 
The annual reunion of the Navy Musicians Association is held in June of each year. During the four-day affair, members form concert bands, big bands and jazz combos that rehearse daily and perform at concerts, dances and jam sessions. A reunion highlight, when location and scheduling permit, is a concert of patriotic music by an active-duty Navy band. 
Reunions are held in the NMA's "homeport" of Virginia Beach, Virginia and in various other cities. Recent locations have included: 
 2006 -- Louisville, Kentucky
 2007 -- Virginia Beach, Virginia
 2008 -- Memphis, Tennessee
 2009 -- Virginia Beach, Virginia
 2010 -- San Antonio, Texas
 2011 -- Virginia Beach, Virginia
 2012 -- Orlando, Florida
 2013 -- Virginia Beach, Virginia
 2014 -- Virginia Beach, Virginia
 2015 -- Virginia Beach, Virginia
 2016 -- Kansas City, Missouri
 2017 -- Virginia Beach, Virginia
 2018 -- Virginia Beach, Virginia
 2019 -- Milwaukee, Wisconsin

Leger Lines 
The Navy Musicians Association's quarterly newsletter is Leger Lines, whose title is borrowed from that of the former newsletter of the U.S. Navy Music Program. Leger Lines is published quarterly and sent to all members.

O.C. McMillan Scholarship Fund
The O.C. McMillan Scholarship Award is a cash award intended to give financial assistance to a young musician who is enrolled in or has been accepted for enrollment in a college-level degree program in music.

References

External links 
 Navy Musicians Association
 Navy Music Program
 Marine Corps Music Section

American veterans' organizations